Cyril Kenneth Sansbury (21 January 1905 – 25 August 1993) was an Anglican bishop in the second half of the 20th century.

Early life and education
Sansbury was educated at St Paul's School, London and Peterhouse, Cambridge.

Ordained ministry
Sansbury trained for ordination at Westcott House, Cambridge and was ordained deacon in 1928 and priest in 1929. His first posts were curacies at Dulwich Common and Wimbledon.

From 1932 Sansbury worked as an SPG Missionary at Numazu, Japan serving in various churches of the Nippon Sei Ko Kai. in 1934 he was appointed Professor at the Central Theological College, Tokyo. In 1938 British Ambassador Sir Robert Craigie appointed Sansbury as Embassy Chaplain. Until the outbreak of hostilities in 1941 Sansbury also served as chaplain to the British congregation at St. Andrew's Church, Tokyo.

After repatriation to Canada he became a World War II chaplain in the RCAF then Warden of Lincoln Theological College until 1952. From 1952 to 1961 he held a similar post at St Augustine's College, Canterbury when he was ordained to the episcopate as Bishop of Singapore. Returning to London in 1966 he was an assistant bishop and General Secretary of the British Council of Churches until 1973. His last post was as priest in charge of St Mary in the Marsh, Norwich.

References

1905 births
People educated at St Paul's School, London
Alumni of Peterhouse, Cambridge
Alumni of Westcott House, Cambridge
Anglican Church in Japan
Anglican bishops of Singapore
Singaporean religious leaders
1993 deaths
Wardens of St Augustine's College, Canterbury
British military chaplains
World War II chaplains
Royal Canadian Air Force chaplains
Staff of Lincoln Theological College
Anglican bishops of West Malaysia